The Dickinson classification is a library classification scheme used to catalogue and classify musical compositions. It was developed by George Sherman Dickinson (1886–1964), and is used by many music libraries, primarily those at University at Buffalo, Vassar, and Columbia Universities.

It is fully detailed by Carol June Bradley in The Dickinson classification : a cataloguing & classification manual for music; including a reprint of the George Sherman Dickinson Classification of Musical Compositions published by Carlisle Books (1968).

External links
 University at Buffalo Music Library Guide to Dickinson Classification

Library cataloging and classification
Musicology